The Badaic languages are a group of three closely related Austronesian languages spoken in the North Lore and South Lore districts in Poso Regency, Central Sulawesi, Indonesia, viz. Bada (Bada’), Behoa (Besoa), and Napu. The three languages are 80–91% lexically similar and to a great degree mutually intelligible,  but their speakers are culturally distinct.

Classification
The classification of the Badaic languages is controversial. While traditionally held to be a branch of the Kaili-Pamona languages, they share many features with languages of the Seko branch of the South Sulawesi languages, and may actually prove to be South Sulawesi languages that were strongly influenced by Kaili-Pamona languages.

Zobel (2020) classifies Badaic with the Seko languages as part of a Seko–Badaic group within the South Sulawesi branch.

References

Further reading

 

Kaili–Pamona languages